The Bell tower in Königsberg (built by the architect Stüler) was a bell tower of the Schlosskirche (Königsberg). After being largely destroyed in World War II by Allied Forces and then annexed by the Soviet Union thereafter, the city was renamed Kaliningrad, and few traces of the former Königsberg remain today. As part of Königsberg Castle, the bell tower of the Schlosskirche (Königsberg) was devastated by the 1944 Bombing of Königsberg and 1945 Battle of Königsberg during World War II. The remnants were demolished in 1968, by which time the city was known as Kaliningrad.

References

1584 establishments in Europe
1944 disestablishments in Germany
Baroque architecture in Germany
Buildings and structures in Germany destroyed during World War II